Solidago glomerata, the clustered goldenrod or skunk goldenrod, is a plant species known only from the mountains of Tennessee and North Carolina. It occurs in spruce woodlands and on rocky outcrops, at elevations over 1500 m (4500 feet)

Solidago glomerata has fleshy, rubbery leaves and yellow flower heads born in groups in the axils of the leaves and at the end of the stem.

References

glomerata
Flora of Tennessee
Flora of North Carolina
Endemic flora of the United States
Plants described in 1803
Taxa named by André Michaux
Flora without expected TNC conservation status